Leptothrix discophora is one of several species of Leptothrix, known for its sheath, and iron-, manganese-, and recently discovered arsenic-removing properties.

References

Burkholderiales